Warren Bryant may refer to:
Warren Bryant (American football) (1955–2021), American football player
Warren Bryant (executive), American business executive